Caianello is a comune (municipality) in the Province of Caserta in the Italian region Campania, located about  northwest of Naples and about  northwest of Caserta.

Caianello borders the following municipalities: Marzano Appio, Roccamonfina, Teano, Vairano Patenora.

References 

Cities and towns in Campania